The Tombs is a 2012 adventure/thriller novel by Clive Cussler and Thomas Perry and the fourth book in the Fargo Adventures series. It was first published in the United States by G. P. Putnam's Sons on September 4, 2012.

Plot
While volunteering their time with an underwater archeology project off the Louisiana coast, the Fargos discover they have hostile competition on the site from amateur treasure hunters. They receive a call from a German professor asking for help with an archeological site in Hungary. When they meet the professor in Germany, he is kidnapped and taken to Hungary by a wealthy and ruthless Hungarian, who claims direct descent from Attila the Hun. They find they were followed by the adventurers who moved in on their site in Louisiana.

The Fargos rescue the professor and soon find themselves on a hunt for hidden treasures buried by Attila and the unknown site of his tomb. Their adventure takes them into a number of countries in Europe and Asia. They also encounter allies of the Hungarian and at the end of the book encounter all their European adversaries at once.

Co-author Clive Cussler has a habit of making cameo appearances in many of his novels.  This time he and his wife offer them a ride to a train station, where the Cusslers plan to travel the Trans-Siberian Railway to its eastern terminus on Siberia's coast. The Fargos depart the train partway in the journey, so they can hunt for a site in Kazakhstan.

Reception
Critical reception has been mostly positive. Publishers Weekly and Kirkus Reviews both wrote favorable reviews for The Tombs and Publishers Weekly commented that "This adventure series stands as one of the crown jewels in the Cussler empire." NorthJersey.com was more mixed in their opinion, as they felt that the "adventure is exciting, but the narrative lacks any element of suspense. And countless scenes of people talking on the telephone become a running gag. Overall, "The Tombs" is better than the last effort in the Fargo books, but the series is still the weakest in the Cussler adventures."

References

2012 American novels
Novels by Clive Cussler
Fargo Adventures
G. P. Putnam's Sons books
Collaborative novels
Michael Joseph books